Argiope taprobanica is a species of spider of the genus Argiope. It is endemic to Sri Lanka.

See also 
 List of Araneidae species

References 

Araneidae
Endemic fauna of Sri Lanka
Spiders of Asia
Spiders described in 1887